Scotland is a city in Telfair and Wheeler counties in the U.S. state of Georgia. As of the 2000 census, the city population was 300.

History
The community was named after Scotland, the ancestral home of a large share of the first settlers. The Georgia General Assembly incorporated Scotland as a town in 1911.

Geography

Scotland is located at  (32.048683, -82.818080).

Demographics

As of the census of 2000, there were 300 people, 111 households, and 81 families residing in the city. The racial makeup of the city was 63.33% White and 36.67% African American. Hispanic or Latino of any race were 1.00% of the population.

There were 111 households, out of which 35.1% had children under the age of 18 living with them, 55.9% were married couples living together, 12.6% had a female householder with no husband present, and 27.0% were non-families. 24.3% of all households were made up of individuals, and 6.3% had someone living alone who was 65 years of age or older.  The average household size was 2.70 and the average family size was 3.16.

In the city, the population was spread out, with 28.7% under the age of 18, 6.0% from 18 to 24, 29.7% from 25 to 44, 25.3% from 45 to 64, and 10.3% who were 65 years of age or older.  The median age was 38 years. For every 100 females, there were 104.1 males.  For every 100 females age 18 and over, there were 96.3 males.

The median income for a household in the city was $30,313, and the median income for a family was $28,333. Males had a median income of $26,667 versus $20,714 for females. The per capita income for the city was $12,418.  About 18.8% of families and 26.0% of the population were below the poverty line, including 36.1% of those under the age of eighteen and 33.3% of those 65 or over.

References

Cities in Georgia (U.S. state)
Cities in Telfair County, Georgia
Cities in Wheeler County, Georgia